Claude-Marguerite Renart de Fuchsamberg d'Amblimont (Rochefort, 1736 — Conde de Regla, Battle of Cape St Vincent, 14 February 1797) was a French Navy officer. He served in the War of American Independence.

Biography 
Amblimont was born to the family of Chef d'Escadre Claude-Thomas Renart d'Amblimont, and was the grandchild on Thomas-Claude Renart de Fuchsamberg Amblimont. He joined the Navy as a Garde-Marine in on 20 December 1751.

He was promoted to Ensign in 1754, and to Lieutenant in 1760.

In 1770, he was made a Knight in the Order of Saint Louis.

On 18 February 1772, he was promoted to Captain. In 1776, he was in command of the frigate Diligente, taking part in the exercises of the Escadre d'évolution.

He captained the 64-gun Vengeur in October 1778 when she and the frigate Belle Poule captured the privateer St Peters. 

In 1757, he took fought to repel the Louisbourg Expedition. 

He invented a new type of Capstan. 

In 1779, he was promoted to Brigadier. In 1781, he was given command of the 74-gun Hercule,  part of the squadron under Guichen and Orvilliers. He took part in the Battle of Martinique on 17 April 1780. Later, he transferred on Brave. He took part in Battle of the Saintes on 12 April 1782, where he was taken prisoner by the British. 
 
On 20 August 1784, he was promoted to Chef d'Escadre. In 1788, he authored Tactique Navale, a well-received book on naval tactics. He was promoted to Contre-amiral on 1 January 1792.

Amblimont then joined the Spanish Navy. He was given command of a division, with his flag on Conde de Regla. He was killed by a cannonball at the Battle of Cape St Vincent on 14 February 1797.

Sources and references 
 Notes

Citations

References
 
 

 

French Navy officers
French military personnel of the American Revolutionary War